The 2012 Auto GP World Series was the third year of the Auto GP series, and the fourteenth season of the former Euroseries 3000. The championship began on 11 March at Monza in Italy and finished on 23 September at Sonoma in the United States, after seven double-header rounds.

The series also introduced an overboost system that has already been used in the FIA Formula Two Championship. The points system for the second race was also amended.

Adrian Quaife-Hobbs won the opening race of the season at Monza after qualifying on pole position by 0.04 seconds. Pål Varhaug finished in second place and returnee Daniël de Jong attained his maiden podium in third. The reverse-grid second race was won by Varhaug, who left the meeting tied for the championship lead with Quaife-Hobbs. Three weeks later at Valencia, Quaife-Hobbs claimed pole again, but was unable to convert pole into another win, losing to Sergey Sirotkin, who became the youngest Auto GP winner, while Varhaug completed the podium. Quaife-Hobbs and Sirotkin continued their battle into the sprint race until an error during Sirotkin's pit-stop ended the battle early. Sirotkin recovered to finish the race in third place behind Quaife-Hobbs – who extended his championship lead with the race win – and Facu Regalia, who scored his first podium.

Two weeks later, the series' first non-European round was held in Morocco, where Sirotkin claimed his first pole position. He made a poor getaway, after being distracted by a marshal at the start. he lost many positions with Varhaug taking the lead. Varhaug was chased by Italian Formula Three champion Sergio Campana, leading until the pit-stop phase. Varhaug stalled in pit lane, losing positions to both Campana and Quaife-Hobbs, with Campana eventually taking his first series win, and the first for Team MLR71, after a close battle with Quaife-Hobbs. Sirotkin took the lead at the start of the second race, but lost time after his pit-stop, allowing Manor MP Motorsport's Chris van der Drift through to take his first win in the series ahead of Sirotkin. Varhaug, Quaife-Hobbs and Giacomo Ricci battled over the final podium position with Varhaug taking the position on-the-road before receiving a 25-second time penalty post-race for cutting a chicane. Ricci was promoted into third place ahead of Quaife-Hobbs, while Varhaug dropped to seventh and lost ground in the championship, falling behind Sirotkin, who moved into second.

Teams and drivers

Race calendar and results
A seven-round calendar was published on 23 December 2011, with all rounds supporting World Touring Car Championship events. On 9 March 2012, it was announced that the Portuguese round moved from Estoril to Portimão.

Championship standings
 Points for both championships were awarded as follows:

In addition:
 One point will be awarded for Pole position for Race One.
 One point will be awarded for fastest lap in each race.

Drivers' Championship

Under-21 Trophy

Teams' Championship

References

External links
Official Auto GP World Series site

Auto GP
Auto GP World Series
Auto GP